The second season of Family Guy first aired on the Fox network in 21 episodes from September 23, 1999, to August 1, 2000. The series follows the dysfunctional Griffin family—father Peter, mother Lois, daughter Meg, son Chris, baby Stewie and their anthropomorphic dog Brian, all of whom reside in their hometown of Quahog. The show features the voices of series creator Seth MacFarlane, Alex Borstein, Seth Green, Lacey Chabert and later Mila Kunis in the roles of the Griffin family. The executive producers for the second production season were David Zuckerman and MacFarlane; the aired season also contained eight episodes which were holdovers from season one.

By the end of the second season, due to low ratings, Fox resorted to canceling Family Guy. However, following a last-minute reprieve, it returned for a third season in 2001. The series was canceled again in 2002; however, high ratings on Fox and high DVD sales renewed Fox's interest in the series. The series returned for a total of 30 new episodes in 2005.

The season received a positive reception from critics, who called the series "extremely witty and darkly hilarious," and was "unfortunately" canceled. The Volume One DVD box set was released in Region 1 on April 15, 2003, and Region 2 on November 12, 2001. All twenty-one of the season's episodes are included in the volume. The first season's seven episodes were also included in the volume.

Production
In 2002, Family Guy was canceled after three seasons due to low ratings. The show was first canceled after the 1999–2000 season, but following a last-minute reprieve, it returned for a third season in 2001. During the third season, Fox announced that the show was canceled for good. Fox tried to sell rights for reruns of the show, but it was hard to find networks that were interested; Cartoon Network eventually bought the rights, " basically for free", according to the president of 20th Century Fox Television Production.

When the reruns were shown on Cartoon Network's Adult Swim in 2003, Family Guy became Adult Swim's most-watched show with an average 1.9 million viewers an episode. Following Family Guys high ratings on Adult Swim, the first and second seasons was released on DVD in April 2003. Sales of the DVD set reached 2.2 million copies, becoming the best-selling television DVD of 2003 and the second highest-selling television DVD ever, behind the first season of Comedy Central's Chappelle's Show. The third season DVD release also sold more than a million copies. The show's popularity in both DVD sales and reruns rekindled Fox's interest in it. They ordered 35 new episodes in 2004, marking the first revival of a television show based on DVD sales. Fox president Gail Berman said that it was one of her most difficult decisions to cancel the show, and was therefore happy it would return. The network also began production of a film based on the series.

Episodes

Reception

The second season of Family Guy received positive reviews from critics. Aaron Beierle of DVD Talk said "Often brilliant, extremely witty and darkly hilarious, Family Guy was unfortunately canceled after Fox bumped it around six or seven different time slots. Fans of the show should definitely pick up this terrific sets , while those who haven't seen it should consider giving it a look." Fewer critics responded negatively to the season, including Ken Tucker of Entertainment Weekly, who graded the series a "D", and named it the worst show of the 1999–2000 television season. Mark Graham noted "MacFarlane's incredibly rocky relationship with both the magazine and its lead television critic, Ken Tucker" in a blog on the New York magazine website. Tucker has also criticized the show for perceived anti-Semitism. L. Brent Bozell III expressed in a column of his written in 1999 that he felt that the episode "Holy Crap" promoted anti-Catholicism.

The Parents Television Council, a watchdog and frequent critic of Family Guy had initially speculated that Family Guy would be "pushing the envelope" before the series' 1999 premiere. In May 2000, in its weekly "E-Alert" email newsletter, the PTC launched a letter-writing campaign to the Fox network to persuade the network to cancel Family Guy following a return from a long hiatus in the show's second season, due to what the PTC claimed were "strong advertiser resistance and low ratings". In addition, Family Guy made the PTC's 2000 "worst prime-time shows for family viewing".

Home Media release
The first and second seasons were released under the title Family Guy Volume One; this standard four-disc DVD box set debuted in Region 1 on April 15, 2003. Distributed by 20th Century Fox Television, it included several DVD extras such as episode commentaries, behind-the-scenes footage, and online promo spots. The same episodes, without the special features, were released in Region 2 on November 12, 2001, and in Region 4 on October 20, 2003.

See also

List of Family Guy episodes

References
Specific

General

External links

 
Family Guy seasons
1999 American television seasons
2000 American television seasons